Ubo may refer to:

 Ubo, the element symbol for Unbioctium
 Ubo, a barangay in Balud, Masbate, Philippines
 Ubo, a barangay in Daram, Samar, Philippines
 Ubo tribe, a tribe within the Lumad peoples of the Philippines

UBO may stand for:
 uBlock Origin, a content-filtering web browser extension
 Unincorporated business organization
 Université de Bretagne Occidentale, Brest, in the Academy of Rennes
 Universitetsbiblioteket i Oslo
 Cal Ripken's Real Baseball, also known as Ultimate Baseball Online
 Ultimate beneficial ownership, a term in domestic and international commercial law

See also
 UBOS (disambiguation)
 Ubu (disambiguation)